Scleropogon kelloggi is a species of robber flies (insects in the family Asilidae).It is found Texas and Arizona.

References

Asilidae
Articles created by Qbugbot